Geastrum huneckii is a species of earthstar fungus in the family Geastraceae. Found in Mongolia, it was formally described as a new species in 1981 by German mycologist Heinrich Dörfelt. The species epithet honours his colleague Siegfried Huneck. Characteristics of the fungus include its hygroscopic exoperidium with four rays, a white endoperidium with a well-delimited peristome, and basidiospores measuring 5.5–6.5 μm in diameter.

References

huneckii
Fungi described in 1981
Fungi of Asia